Javier Alejandro Manzano Salazar (born 5 June 1963) is a Mexican politician affiliated with the National Regeneration Movement. He served as Deputy of the LXIV Legislature of the Mexican Congress representing Guerrero, and previously served as municipal president of Alcozauca de Guerrero.

References

1963 births
Living people
Politicians from Guerrero
Party of the Democratic Revolution politicians
Municipal presidents in Guerrero
21st-century Mexican politicians
Deputies of the LXIV Legislature of Mexico
Members of the Chamber of Deputies (Mexico) for Guerrero